The Buck-Mercer House, on Waynesburg Road in Pulaski County, Kentucky near Somerset, was built as a single pen log house around 1810.

The south pen was built with half-dovetail notching and included a limestone chimney.  A second, north pen with a dog trot between was added in 1858.  It is the only double pen dogtrot house surviving in the county.

References

Log houses
Dogtrot architecture in Kentucky
National Register of Historic Places in Pulaski County, Kentucky
Houses completed in 1810
Double pen architecture in the United States
Log buildings and structures on the National Register of Historic Places in Kentucky
1810 establishments in Kentucky